Woodlands Park is a small, affluent and quiet suburb on the western outskirts of West Auckland, New Zealand. Nestled in the Waitākere Ranges, Woodlands Park lies in a valley, bush clad hills separating it from Titirangi (to the north east), Parau and Huia (to the south east) and Laingholm (to the south).

Most housing was built in the 1950s to 1970s, and lies within native bush. Although largely composed of workers commuting to Auckland, and socially linked to Titirangi, Woodlands Park is a small reasonably active community. There is a primary school, which forms the communal heart, 2 dairies and a mechanic. Original home of the Commercial bus company.

History

The area that would later become Woodlands Park was established as farmland during the 1860s. Between the 1860s and 1914, the main access to the outside world was by the dock at Little Muddy Creek, until road access became more common. In the early 20th century, the area was a part of McEldowney fruit farm, owned by an Irish immigrant family.

Demographics
It is part of the Waima-Woodlands Park statistical area.

Woodlands Park had a population of 1,077 at the 2018 New Zealand census, an increase of 84 people (8.5%) since the 2013 census, and an increase of 99 people (10.1%) since the 2006 census. There were 351 households, comprising 510 males and 564 females, giving a sex ratio of 0.9 males per female, with 261 people (24.2%) aged under 15 years, 168 (15.6%) aged 15 to 29, 570 (52.9%) aged 30 to 64, and 87 (8.1%) aged 65 or older.

Ethnicities were 89.4% European/Pākehā, 8.4% Māori, 1.7% Pacific peoples, 8.4% Asian, and 3.1% other ethnicities. People may identify with more than one ethnicity.

Although some people chose not to answer the census's question about religious affiliation, 65.5% had no religion, 22.6% were Christian, 0.6% were Hindu, 0.8% were Muslim and 3.1% had other religions.

Of those at least 15 years old, 294 (36.0%) people had a bachelor's or higher degree, and 78 (9.6%) people had no formal qualifications. 273 people (33.5%) earned over $70,000 compared to 17.2% nationally. The employment status of those at least 15 was that 504 (61.8%) people were employed full-time, 129 (15.8%) were part-time, and 15 (1.8%) were unemployed.

Education
Woodlands Park School is a contributing primary (years 1–6) state school with a roll of  students as of  The school was founded in 1958. Titirangi Rudolf Steiner School is a full primary (years 1–8) private school with a roll of  students. It was founded in 1987 and provides education based on the Steiner-Waldorf philosophy. Both schools are co-educational.

The nearest State secondary schools are Green Bay High School, Kelston Boys' High School and Kelston Girls' High School. Catholic students usually commute by train from New Lynn to Marist College (girls) or St Peter's College (boys).

References

Suburbs of Auckland
Waitākere Ranges
Waitākere Ranges Local Board Area
West Auckland, New Zealand